The 1996 DFB-Pokal Final decided the winner of the 1995–96 DFB-Pokal, the 53rd season of Germany's premier knockout football cup competition. It was played on 25 May 1996 at the Olympiastadion in Berlin. 1. FC Kaiserslautern won the match 1–0 against Karlsruher SC to claim their second cup title.

Route to the final
The DFB-Pokal was a 64 teams in a single-elimination knockout cup competition. There were a total of five rounds leading up to the final. Teams were drawn against each other, and the winner after 90 minutes would advance. If still tied, 30 minutes of extra time was played. If the score was still level, a penalty shoot-out was used to determine the winner.

Note: In all results below, the score of the finalist is given first (H: home; A: away).

Match

Details

References

External links
 Match report at kicker.de 
 Match report at WorldFootball.net
 Match report at Fussballdaten.de 

Karlsruher SC matches
1. FC Kaiserslautern matches
1995–96 in German football cups
1996
May 1996 sports events in Europe
1996 in Berlin
Football competitions in Berlin